Saint-Secondin is a commune in the Vienne department in the Nouvelle-Aquitaine region in western France.

Geography
The village lies in the middle of the commune, on the right bank of the Clouère, which flows northwest through the commune.

See also
Communes of the Vienne department

References

Communes of Vienne